Kurt Roland "Kurre" Hamrin (born 19 November 1934) is a Swedish former professional footballer who played as a winger. He began his career in his home country with AIK, but later played for several Italian clubs, most notably Fiorentina, with whom he won two Coppa Italia titles, a Cup Winners' Cup, and a Mitropa Cup over nine years, making over 350 appearances for the club and scoring over 200 goals in all competitions. A prolific goalscorer, he is currently the eighth highest goalscorer of all-time in Italy's Serie A, with 190 goals. 

In addition to his success at club level, Hamrin also had a successful international career, and was a member of the Swedish team that reached the 1958 FIFA World Cup Final on home soil; he is commonly regarded as one of the greatest Swedish footballers of all-time, as well as one of Fiorentina's greatest players ever.

Club career
Hamrin first played for AIK in Sweden, whom he joined in the 1952–53 season. He then joined Italian side Juventus in 1956 and played 23 games during his single season there, notching eight goals. After that one season, he joined Padova on loan, where he scored 20 goals in 30 games. He would only stay there for one season again, however, as he was sold to Fiorentina in 1958, where he stayed until 1967, playing 289 Serie A games and scoring 150 goals. While at Fiorentina, he won the Coppa Italia in 1961 and 1966, as well as the 1960–61 European Cup Winners' Cup (finishing the competition as the top–scorer with six goals, including one in the second leg of the final, a 2–1 home victory over Rangers), and the 1966 Mitropa Cup. Hamrin is commonly regarded as one of Fiorentina's greatest ever players, and is the team's all–time highest goalscorer, with 208 goals. He joined A.C. Milan in 1967 and played there for two seasons, winning the league title in 1968; he also scored both goals for Milan as they overcame Hamburg 2–0 in the 1968 European Cup Winners' Cup Final. The following season, the team won the European Cup. His final Italian club was Napoli, whom he joined from Milan in 1969. In 1971, he return to Sweden, playing one season for IFK Stockholm before retiring in 1972.

International career
Hamrin played 32 times for Sweden between 1953 and 1965, scoring 17 goals. Most Swedes remember him best for the goal he scored against West Germany in the semi finals of the 1958 FIFA World Cup on home soil. The goal allowed Sweden to win the match 3–1, and secure a place in the final against Brazil, where they were defeated 5–2, however.

After retirement
After his retirement as a footballer, Hamrin moved to Florence with his family, where he is still living today. He also worked as scout for A.C. Milan from 1998 to 2008. 

A member of "Exilgnagare" – a club for AIK supporters worldwide, Hamrin is probably one of the finest players the club ever produced and is still a big favourite among the supporters at the club. Hamrin, settled in Florence after his spell at Fiorentina; he still follows his beloved AIK, and usually makes the trip home every summer to catch a couple of games.

Style of play
Hamrin was a fast, creative, elegant, and technically skilled right winger, who was gifted with outstanding pace, as well as good vision, and opportunism in front of goal. A direct and efficient two–footed player, he was known in particular for his flair, as well as his incredible dribbling and striking ability with either foot, and stood out for his ability to utilise his speed to get past his opponents; he was also capable of beating players in one–on–one situations with elaborate moves and feints, such as the nutmeg. Moreover, he was a highly prolific goalscorer. Despite his playing ability, however, he was also known to be injury–prone.

Career statistics

International 

 Scores and results list Sweden's goal tally first, score column indicates score after each Hamrin goal.

Honours
Fiorentina

 UEFA Cup Winners' Cup: 1960–61
 Mitropa Cup: 1966
 Coppa Italia: 1960–61, 1965–66

A.C. Milan

 European Cup: 1968–69
 UEFA Cup Winners' Cup: 1967–68
 Serie A: 1967–68

Sweden
 FIFA World Cup runner-up: 1958
Individual
 Allsvenskan top scorer: 1954–55
 UEFA Cup Winners' Cup Top Scorer: 1960–61 (6 goals)
 FIFA XI: 1967
 UEFA President Award: 2014
 ACF Fiorentina Hall of Fame: 2012
 Fiorentina All-time XI
 Fiorentina All-time top scorer

References

External links

 Kurt Hamrin. aik.se

1934 births
Living people
Association football wingers
Expatriate footballers in Italy
Swedish expatriate footballers
Swedish expatriate sportspeople in Italy
Swedish footballers
AIK Fotboll players
Allsvenskan players
Sweden international footballers
Serie A players
Juventus F.C. players
ACF Fiorentina players
A.C. Milan players
S.S.C. Napoli players
Calcio Padova players
1958 FIFA World Cup players
Footballers from Stockholm
IFK Stockholm players
UEFA Champions League winning players